The ornate skink, Oligosoma ornatum, is a rare species of skink endemic to New Zealand. This species was once widespread through much of the North Island and on many offshore islands in the Hauraki Gulf and north of the Coromandel Peninsula. Habitat destruction and predation by introduced species has now reduced their range to scattered localities throughout the North Island as far south as Wellington, as well as on the Three Kings Islands, Great Barrier Island, and a few other offshore islands.

Ornate skinks co-exist widely with copper skinks, and at selected localities with robust skinks, Mokohinau skinks, McGregor's skinks, Poor Knights skinks and on Great Barrier and Little Barrier Islands, marbled skinks. Ornate skinks are not currently known to co-exist with Whitaker's skinks.

Ornate skinks can be identified by the white or yellowish "teardrop" edged with black, below each eye.

Conservation status 
In 2012 the Department of Conservation classified the ornate skink as At Risk under the New Zealand Threat Classification System. It was judged as meeting the criteria for At Risk threat status as a result of it having a low to high ongoing or predicted decline. This skink is also regarded as being Conservation Dependant.

References

Reptiles of New Zealand
Oligosoma